Kailash Chandra Trivedi (died 7 October 2020) was an Indian politician and member of the Rajasthan Legislative Assembly from 2018 till his death in 2020, and previously from 2003 to 2013, representing Sahara. Trivedi died from COVID-19 aged 65. In a 2021 by-poll, his wife, Gayatri Devi Trivedi was elected as an INC candidate, to his vacant seat.

References

1950s births
2020 deaths
Rajasthan MLAs 2003–2008
Rajasthan MLAs 2008–2013
Rajasthan MLAs 2018–2023
Indian National Congress politicians from Rajasthan
Deaths from the COVID-19 pandemic in India
People from Bhilwara district